Arthur Tashko (1901-1994) was an Albanian born in Korçë, in the Manastir Vilayet of the Ottoman Empire (present-day Albania) 10 April 1901, an American modern painter, lawyer and musician. As a cubist painter he exposed his art works in Vienna, Austria together with Picasso, Léger, Delaunay, Jean Arp and after a period he met with abstract expressionists  Pollock, de Kooning and Rothko. In 1923 invited from his brother Kostandin Tashko who was a diplomat in Albanian Embassy in Washington, DC U.S., and he transferred to Boston and graduated from Harvard Law School. After his career as a lawyer he studied Fine Arts in the Museum of Fine Arts, Boston and deepen his knowledge in Boston Conservatory for flute sharing this passion with his sister famous Albanian singer Tefta Tashko-Koço.In 1962 he moved from U.S. to Spain and after with his second wife Rosa in Bogota, Colombia and lived and worked there for 31 years. Arthur Tashko is constructivist painter with a wide creativity well known in Cubism, and part of Colombian culture where he lived most and changed life at the age of 93 years, 1994.

See also 
Modern Albanian art

References 
University of Pad ova
Albanian Library

External links 
National Art Gallery, Albania
Museonacional.gov.co
Albanianscreen.tv

1901 births
1994 deaths
People from Korçë
People from Manastir vilayet
Albanians from the Ottoman Empire
Albanian painters
People's Artists of Albania
Harvard Law School alumni
20th-century American painters
American male painters
20th-century American male artists
Albanian emigrants to the United States